Margaret Davis Bowen (May 24, 1894 – April 1976) was a religious leader, civil rights activist and educator who led the Gilbert Academy, a top private black college in New Orleans, during the late 1930s. She received her M. Ed. from the University of Cincinnati in 1935. From 1936 to 1939 she served as international president of Alpha Kappa Alpha sorority, which has a Margaret Davis Bowen Outstanding Alumni Award for the Southeast Region. In 1948 she resigned from Gilbert and moved to Atlanta where she was active in the Methodist church.

She was the first president of the neighborhood association of Just Us, a tiny westside neighborhood of Atlanta near Washington Park, which has dedicated a small park in her honor.

She died in April 1976 after a period of illness in a nursing home in Columbus, Ohio.

She was married to John Wesley Edward Bowen, a bishop in the Methodist church.

A son, John W. E. Bowen III, was a state senator in Ohio.

Publications
"Youth in a Changing World", The Ivy Leaf, Alpha Kappa Alpha Sorority, March 1939. Vol. 17, No. 1.

References

External links
 New Orleans Tribune, "Gilbert Academy’s Legacy of Distinction", November 1985
 
 Margaret Davis Bowen's frozen custard recipe: 

1894 births
1976 deaths
University of Cincinnati alumni
American civil rights activists
African-American educators
20th-century American educators
African-American Methodists
American Methodists
Alpha Kappa Alpha presidents